Jakki Degg (born 20 February 1978) is an English glamour model and actress.  While the bulk of her work has been done in England, she has appeared in American film and television, and has posed for posters and magazine pictorials.

Early life
Although born in Stone, Degg, daughter of David Degg, was raised in Hednesford, Staffordshire, England. Degg studied dance as a child, particularly ballet, and won several competitions.  She went on to hairdressing school and managed a salon of her own by age 20.

Career

Modelling
Jakki became famous when, at her mother's encouragement, she entered and won the inaugural Max Power magazine babes competition.  Following this she became a Page 3 girl for The Sun newspaper.  She has posed topless and semi-nude for lad mags such as Front.

Acting
She has appeared on television several times.  She had a small role in the drama Is Harry on the Boat? (Sky One) and played the lead in the short film Remember My Dream, directed by Joao Costa Menezes.  She was also a stand-in for the TV show The Games but was not used. She wielded a shotgun on Channel 4's Banzai as viewers were encouraged to wager on how many balloons she would pop with it.

Degg won the Page 3 model charity special edition of BBC1's The Weakest Link, beating Leilani Dowding in the sudden death round, with her winnings going to the RSPCA. However, her appearance on the show's 1,000th episode was short lived, as she was the first contestant eliminated on a countback.   She was sent off after incorrectly answering the question: "In the abbreviated names of fruit and veg often found in a greengrocers, pots is an abbreviation of which word?", to which Degg answered "Pottery"; the correct answer was potatoes.

In 2004 she won the Celebrity 24 Hour Quiz on ITV with her winnings also going to the RSPCA.

She also appeared in The Poker Academy, and the American film Eurotrip.

References

External links 

 Jakki Degg's official site
 

1978 births
Glamour models
Living people
Page 3 girls
People from Stone, Staffordshire
People educated at Kingsmead School, Hednesford